La Puntilla may refer to:
La Puntilla, Belén, Catamarca, Argentina
La Puntilla, Santa María, Catamarca, Argentina
La Puntilla, Tinogasta, Catamarca, Argentina
La Puntilla, La Rioja, a city in Argentina
La Puntilla District, Luján de Cuyo Department, Mendoza, Argentina
La Puntilla (Samborondón), a parish of Samborondón, Ecuador
La Puntilla beach, in El Puerto de Santa María, Cádiz, Spain